Bonnie Lee (June 11, 1931 – September 7, 2006) was an American Chicago blues singer known as "The Sweetheart of the Blues". She is best remembered for her lengthy working relationships with Sunnyland Slim and Willie Kent. David Whiteis, who interviewed Lee in researching his book Chicago Blues: Portraits and Stories, stated, "she was one of the last of her genre, the big-voiced woman blues singer fronting a Chicago band."

Biography
She was born Jessie Lee Frealls in Bunkie, Louisiana, and raised in Beaumont, Texas.

She learned to play the piano as a child. Her mother refused to let her join the gospel singer Lillian Glinn on tour. She later toured with the Famous Georgia Minstrels, meeting Clarence "Gatemouth" Brown and Big Mama Thornton.

In 1958 she moved to Chicago and chose the stage name Bonnie Lee, working as both a dancer and singer.  Two years later she signed a recording contract with J. Mayo Williams's Ebony Records. Williams insisted on billing her as Bonnie "Bombshell" Lane on her first single, "Sad and Evil Woman". She disliked the name. After the single failed to sell, she returned to Chicago jazz and blues nightclubs. She was later billed as Bonnie Lee Murray, using the surname of her husband at the time.

In 1967 Lee first appeared on a bill with the pianist Sunnyland Slim, and their working arrangement included residencies at several Chicago clubs. At the end of the 1970s, she recorded further singles, released by AIrway Records (owned by Slim Records). She suffered from poor health at that time but then enjoyed a long professional partnership with Willie Kent. Backed by Willie Kent and the Gents, she became a regular performer at B.L.U.E.S., a noted Chicago blues club, for many years. There she sang her most famous numbers, "I’m Good" and "Need Your Love So Bad."

In 1982, performing with Zora Young and Big Time Sarah as Blues with the Girls, she toured Europe, and they recorded an album in Paris. In 1992 Lee performed on Magic Slim's album 44 Blues, with John Primer. Her album Sweetheart of the Blues was released under her own name by Delmark Records in 1995, and three years later another collection, I'm Good, was issued.

Lee died on September 7, 2006, at the age of 75, after years of poor health.

Partial discography

See also
 List of Chicago blues musicians

References

External links
 Illustrated discography at Hubcap.clemson.edu
  David Whiteis, "'I Need Someone's Hand' – Bonnie Lee's Life in the Blues", Chicago Reader article and interview, February 4, 1993

1931 births
2006 deaths
American blues singers
Chicago blues musicians
Blues musicians from Louisiana
Soul-blues musicians
People from Beaumont, Texas
People from Bunkie, Louisiana
20th-century American singers
Singers from Louisiana
20th-century American women singers
21st-century American women